The 24th Central American Championships in Athletics were held at the Estadio de Atletismo del Instituto Nicaragüense de Deportes in Managua, Nicaragua, between June 21–23, 2013.

A total of 43 events were contested, 22 by men and 21 by women.

Medal summary
Complete results and medal winners were published.

Men

Women

Medal table (unofficial)

Team trophies
Costa Rica won the team trophies in all three categories.

Total

Male

Female

Participation
An unofficial count yields the participation of about 226 athletes from 7 countries: 

 (7)
 (64)
 (30)
 (22)
 (11)
 (44)
 Panamá (48)

References

 
International athletics competitions hosted by Nicaragua
Central American Championships in Athletics
Central American Championships in Athletics
Central American Championships in Athletics
Sport in Managua